Kimbu may be:
Kimbu people
Kimbu language